Kenneth Lee Griffith (July 31, 1918 – June 5, 2005) was an American professional basketball player. He played for the Akron Goodyear Wingfoots in the National Basketball League and averaged 1.5 points per game.

Griffith did not play competitive basketball until attending Alderson Broaddus University. In his career he scored 1,941 points and passed legendary Stanford player Hank Luisetti's for a then all-time college basketball career scoring record. Griffith also served in World War II and later worked at Goodyear for close to 40 years.

References

1918 births
2005 deaths
Akron Goodyear Wingfoots players
Alderson Broaddus Battlers men's basketball players
American men's basketball players
United States Navy personnel of World War II
Basketball players from Virginia
Guards (basketball)